Rockin' Road Trip (also known as Summer Time Blues) is a 1985 comedy film directed by William Olsen.  The film is distributed by Troma Entertainment.

External links

1985 films
1985 comedy films
American independent films
Troma Entertainment films
American comedy films
1980s English-language films
1980s American films